François Marie may refer to:

 Charles François Marie Baron (20th century), French colonial governor
 François Marie Daudin (1776–1803), French zoologist
 François Marie, Prince of Lillebonne (1624–1694), French nobleman
 Louis François Marie Le Tellier (1668–1701), French statesman
 François Marie de Lorraine, Count of Maubec (1686–1706), French nobleman and son of Alphonse Henri, Count of Harcourt
 Pierre François Marie Auguste Dejean (1780–1845), French entomologist
 François Marie, Chevalier de Reggio (1732–1787), Italian nobleman

See also
 François-Marie
 Marie François